Louis Neumann (1941 – 2003) was a South African-born professional rugby league player and coach. Originally a rugby union player, he was signed by Leeds in 1960–61. Having made 123 appearances for the English side, he moved to Australia to play for the Eastern Suburbs ahead of the 1967 NSWRFL season. He played in 81 matches for the club, including 22 as player-coach in 1969, following the departure of Jack Gibson.

After leaving the Eastern Suburbs in 1971, Neumann moved to Orange, New South Wales, and became the player-coach of Orange Ex-Services. He died in 2003.

References

1941 births
2003 deaths
Leeds Rhinos players
South African expatriate rugby league players
South African expatriate sportspeople in Australia
South African expatriate sportspeople in England
South African rugby league coaches
Sydney Roosters players
Sydney Roosters captains
Sydney Roosters coaches
White South African people